The Savage Girl is the first novel by American author Alex Shakar, released in 2001. The protagonist, Ursula Van Urden, has taken on the responsibility of caring for her younger sister who suffers from schizophrenia.

Plot summary
Burnt-out art student Ursula Van Urden arrives in Middle City, a fictional American metropolis built around a volcano, with plans to care for her younger sister, Ivy. A well known fashion model, Ivy had recently suffered a much-publicized schizophrenic meltdown. Having spent some time in Middle City, Ursula soon begins working for Ivy's former boyfriend. Her employer, Chas Lacouture is the owner of the trendspotting firm, Tomorrow, Ltd. She is trained as a trendspotter by both Chas a new coworker, Javier Delreal.

A manic optimist, Javier takes her on rollerblading and party-crashing expeditions, predicting a new megatrend he calls the "Light Age," a "renaissance of self-creation," which he believes will coincide with the defeat of irony. By contrast, Chas, a cynical ex-philosophy professor, takes her to skulk in supermarkets and spy on customers, and introduces her to the concept of "paradessence,", the "broken soul" at the center of every product, consisting of two opposing desires that it will promise to satisfy simultaneously.

As Ivy resumes her modeling activities, Ursula's trendspotting work focuses on a homeless girl who lives in a city park, makes her own clothing, and hunts pigeons for food. This eponymous "savage girl" forms the basis of a marketing campaign for a new product, "Diet Water," and serves as a harbinger, for Chas and Javier alike, of the new age to come.

Characters
 Ursula Van Urden – Protagonist
 Ivy Van Urden – Ursula's younger sister, a schizophrenic fashion model
 Chas Lacouture – Ursula's boss, a trendspotter
 Javier Delreal – Ursula's coworker, a trendspotter
 The Savage Girl – a homeless girl, the basis for Ursula's marketing campaign
 Gwennan – Ursula's and Ivy's mother, a retired plastic surgeon
 James T. Couch – Ursula's coworker, über-ironist and trendspotter
 Ed Cabaj – head of marketing for General Foods' New Beverage division
 Camille Stypnick – art director for the ad agency Mitchell and Chennault
 Eeven – an inner-city boy for whom Javier becomes a Big Brother

References
 Alex Shakar, The Savage Girl, p. 24
 Alex Shakar, The Savage Girl, p. 60

Release details
 2001, USA, HarperCollins, hardcover
 2001, UK, Scribner, 
 2002, USA, HarperPerennial, paperback
 2002, France (“Look Sauvage,” trans. Daniel Lemoine), Au Diable Vauvert, 
 2002, Germany (“Der Letzte Schrei,” trans. Johannes Sabinski), Rowohlt, 
 2003, Japan (trans. Masako Sasada), Artist House Publishers, 
 2003, Poland (“Dzikuska,” trans. Dorota Stadnik), MUZA SA, 
 2005, Italy (“La Selvaggia,” trans. Elisa Villa), Fanucci Editore, 
 Thailand, Siam Inter Books,

External links
 The Savage Girl page on author website
 Janet Maslin, “A City’s Pledge of Allegiance: Shop Till You Drop,” The New York Times, Sep. 20, 2001, https://query.nytimes.com/gst/fullpage.html?res=9A0DE5DC133BF933A1575AC0A9679C8B63&scp=1&sq=alex%20shakar&st=cse (review)
 Kirkus Reviews, Oct. 1, 2001, http://www.kirkusreviews.com/book-reviews/fiction/alex-shakar/the-savage-girl/ (review)
 Irene Lascher, “‘Savage’ Satire Blurs Lines of Popular Culture,” Los Angeles Times, Dec. 14, 2001, http://articles.latimes.com/2001/dec/14/news/lv-shakar14,   (feature)
 Martha Bayne, “Irony in the Crosshairs,” Chicago Reader, Oct. 4, 2001, http://www.chicagoreader.com/chicago/irony-in-the-crosshairs/Content?oid=906629 (feature)

2001 American novels
2001 debut novels